Lost Boys Studios – School of Visual Effects is a PTIB-accredited private academy for visual effects and artistry, located in Vancouver, British Columbia, Canada.

History
Lost Boys Studios – School of Visual Effects (VFX) was founded by Gemini Award and Emmy Award nominated Mark Bénard in 2006 in his hometown of Comox, British Columbia. After building his career in visual effects from his own studio, Lost Boys Studios Inc, partnered with Virgin Group Digital Studios, and teaching at Vancouver Film School, Benard turned his eye to education, focusing on hands on, project based learning. In 2011, the school moved back to Vancouver to the historic Gastown district and is the only school in North America that is dedicated only to visual effects. In 2015, they moved from Gastown to 1825 Victoria Diversion, Vancouver, where they are currently located. In 2018, Lost Boys was ranked one of the Top 10 Visual Effects Schools by The Hollywood Reporter. The Rookies Awards judges viewed work created by students from 581 schools around the world and selected Lost Boys as the second Best Visual Effects School in the World in 2018. Lost Boys Studios - School of VFX hosts various workshops and visits from VFX/Animation studios on a regular basis.

Notable alumni
George Kyparissous - Senior FX TD for Thor: Ragnarok, Red Sparrow, and Venom.
Perry Hyunwoo Sohn - Senior Layout Technical Director for Deepwater Horizon, Rogue One: A Star Wars Story, Transformers: The Last Knight, and Aquaman
Grant Robertson - Visual Effects Supervisor for Warcraft: The Beginning and Compositing Supervisor for Gotham.
Monica Rodriguez Bautista - Senior Paint Artist for 'The Hobbit: The Desolation of Smaug, Dawn of the Planet of the Apes, and The Hobbit: The Battle of the Five ArmiesGregory Watkins - 2D Supervisor for Stranger Things, Rampage, and The PredatorDavid Zeng - Compositor for Batman v Superman: Dawn of Justice, Terminator: Genysis, Hunger Games: Mockingjay - Part 1, Hunger Games Mockingjay - Part 2, and Oscar nominated film Guardians of the Galaxy. Pipeline Technical Director on Emmy winning Game of Thrones.
Eduardo Bivar - Prep Artist for Academy Award winning film Blade Runner 2049, Annihilation, and Lighting TD/Compositor for Hotel Transylvania 3: Summer Vacation''.

See also
 Higher education in British Columbia

References

External links
 
 http://lostboys-vfx.com Lost Boys Studios - A Knowledge Repository
 http://beta.artschoolreviews.ca/reviews/lost-boys-learning/visual-effects-production/how-to-become-a-visual-effects-artist How to Become a Visual Effects Artist
 https://web.archive.org/web/20120620213100/http://www.artschoolreviews.ca/reviews/lost-boys-learning/visual-effects/what-lbl-has-taught-me What Lost Boys Has Taught Me

Visual effects companies
Art schools in Canada
Cinema of British Columbia
Private schools in British Columbia